The 2000–01 Magyar Kupa (English: Hungarian Cup) was the 61st season of Hungary's annual knock-out cup football competition.

Quarter-finals
Games were played on March 28, 2001.

|}

Semi-finals
Games were played on May 2 and 8, 2001.

|}

Final

See also
 2000–01 Nemzeti Bajnokság I
 2000–01 Nemzeti Bajnokság II

References

External links
 Official site 
 soccerway.com

2000–01 in Hungarian football
2000–01 domestic association football cups
2000-01